Sebastián Driussi (born 9 February 1996) is an Argentine professional footballer who plays as an attacking midfielder for Major League Soccer club Austin FC.

Club career

River Plate
On 2 December 2013, Driussi made his debut for River Plate as a starter in an Argentine Primera División match against Argentinos Juniors, playing 73 minutes in a 1–0 victory. His first league goal for the club came over a year later, as he scored in a 2–2 draw against Unión de Santa on 8 March 2015.

Zenit Saint Petersburg
On 8 July 2017, Driussi joined Russian side Zenit Saint Petersburg on a four-year deal. The transfer fee was €15 million. He scored his first goal for Zenit on 22 July 2017 in a brace against FC Rubin Kazan. His second goal came in the same game at stoppage time from a cross by teammate Domenico Criscito which helped them win their second fixture of the season under Roberto Mancini. On 4 May 2019, he scored a late equalizer in an away game against FC Akhmat Grozny that secured the 2018–19 Russian Premier League championship for Zenit.

On 26 July 2021, Driussi bought out the remaining year of his contract with Zenit St.Petersburg, and left the club.

Austin FC
Driussi signed with Major League Soccer club Austin FC on 29 July 2021 as a designated player. He made his debut on 7 August 2021 against FC Dallas, coming on as a 62nd minute substitute in the 2–0 defeat. Driussi scored his first goal for the club on 21 August 2021 in a 3–1 home victory against the Portland Timbers. On 16 April 2022, Driussi became the first Austin FC player to score 10 goals for the club in a comeback road win at D.C. United.

Driussi was named one of 26 players to make the 2022 MLS All-Star team. On 14 February 2023, Driussi signed a new 3-year contract with Austin FC through the end of the 2025 season, with an option for the 2026 season.

Career statistics

Honours
River Plate
Argentina Primera Division: 2014 Final
Copa Argentina: 2015–16
Copa Libertadores: 2015
Copa Sudamericana: 2014
Recopa Sudamericana: 2016
Suruga Bank Championship: 2015

Argentina U20
South American Youth Football Championship: 2015

Zenit Saint Petersburg
Russian Premier League: 2018–19, 2019–20, 2020–21
Russian Cup: 2019–20
Russian Super Cup: 2020, 2021

Individual
MLS All-Star: 2022
MLS Player of the Month: April 2022, July 2022
MLS Best XI: 2022

External links

http://en.fc-zenit.ru/zenit/players/driussi/ Driussi at the Zenit Official Website

References

Living people
1996 births
Footballers from Buenos Aires
Argentine people of Italian descent
Association football forwards
Argentine footballers
Argentina youth international footballers
Argentina under-20 international footballers
2015 South American Youth Football Championship players
Argentine Primera División players
Russian Premier League players
Club Atlético River Plate footballers
FC Zenit Saint Petersburg players
Austin FC players
Argentine expatriate footballers
Argentine expatriate sportspeople in Russia
Expatriate footballers in Russia
Argentine expatriate sportspeople in the United States
Expatriate soccer players in the United States
Designated Players (MLS)
Major League Soccer players